Allegro Con Brio is a 1979 Soviet World War II drama about a unit of Soviet military specialists working to discover the secrets of Nazi naval mines.

Plot
The film is set in June 1941, when Nazi troops were blocking the Soviet Black Sea fleet with new top-secret magnetic-acoustic naval mines.  Seeking to neutralize these fearsome weapons, a special group of professional bomb disposal combat engineers was assembled by Soviet military commanders — a group that would carry out their task at the price of their lives.

External links

1979 films
1979 drama films
Soviet drama films
Russian drama films
Eastern Front of World War II films
1970s Russian-language films
Odesa Film Studio films